Skinnerbox is a third wave ska band formed in New York City in the late 1980s by King Django.

Discography

Full Length
Instrumental Conditioning (Stubborn) 1990)
Now & Then (Stubborn) (1992)
Tales of the Red (Stubborn) (1993)
What You Can Do, What You Can't (Moon Ska) (1997)
Demonstration (Triple Crown Records/Stubborn)(1998)

EPs
Sunken Treasure (Stubborn) (1994)

7" Singles
"Does He Love You" b/w "Right Side" (Stubborn) (1993)
Hepcat Season b/w I Got To Know (Stubborn) (1998)

Compilations
Special Wild 1989-1994 (Stubborn) (1996)

References

American ska musical groups
Third-wave ska groups
Triple Crown Records artists